Michael Cusack (Irish: Mícheál Ó Cíosóig; 20 September 1847 – 28 November 1906) was an Irish teacher and founder of the Gaelic Athletic Association.

Life

Cusack was born to Irish speaking parents, in the parish of Carron on the eastern fringe of the Burren, County Clare, in 1847, during the Great Irish Famine. Cusack became a national school teacher, and after teaching in various parts of Ireland became a professor in 1874, in Blackrock College, then known as the French College. In 1877, Cusack established his own Civil Service Academy, 'Cusack's Academy' in Dublin which proved successful in preparing pupils for the civil service examinations.

A romantic nationalist, Cusack was also "reputed" to have been associated with the Fenian movement. He was active in the Gaelic revival: a member of the Society for the Preservation of the Irish Language which was founded in 1876, and later the Gaelic League who in 1879 broke away from the Society. Also in 1879, Cusack met Pat Nally, who was a member of the Irish Republican Brotherhood and a leading nationalist and athlete. Cusack found that Nally's views on the influence of British landlordism on Irish athletics were the same as his. Cusack would recall how both Nally and himself while walking through the Phoenix Park in Dublin seeing only a handful of people playing sports in the park so depressed them that they agreed it was time to "make an effort to preserve the physical strength of [their] race." Nally organised a National Athletics Sports meeting in County Mayo in September 1879 which was a success, with Cusack organising a similar event which was open to 'artisans' in Dublin the following April.

On 1 November 1884, Cusack together with Maurice Davin, of Carrick-on-Suir, County Tipperary, called a meeting in Hayes' Commercial Hotel, Thurles, County Tipperary, and founded the Gaelic Athletic Association (GAA). Davin was elected president and Cusack became its first secretary. Later, Archbishop Thomas William Croke (28 May 1824 – 22 July 1902), Archbishop of Cashel & Emly, Michael Davitt and Charles Stewart Parnell became patrons. Cusack also became involved in the Irish language movement, founding  The Celtic Times, a weekly newspaper which focused on 'native games' and Irish culture.

Cusack died on Morning Star Avenue, Dublin at 5pm on Wednesday 28 November 1906 from a final heart attack at the age of 59.

Legacy

The newly opened Michael Cusack Visitor Centre located on the original homestead in Poulaphuca townland, Carran, the Burren, County Clare is dedicated to recounting the fascinating story of Michael Cusack and the idealism which led to him founding the Gaelic Athletic Association.

The bigoted character of "The Citizen" in James Joyce's novel Ulysses is thought to have been at least in part based on what has been described as "a jaundiced portrait of Michael Cusack".

The Clare GAA pitch in Ennis, and the Westmeath GAA pitch in Mullingar, are both named "Cusack Park" in his honour, as is the "Cusack Stand" in Croke Park, Dublin.

The primary school Gaelscoil Mhíchíl Cíosóg in Ennis, County Clare, is also named after him.

Michael Cusacks's Sydney GAA Club was founded in 1988 by a group of Clare men and was named in honour of the man from Carran.

Chicago Michael Cusack Hurling Club is a GAA club consisting entirely of American-born players founded in 2008.

A small collection of family papers was donated to the James Hardiman Library, NUI Galway, by his grandniece, Patricia O'Connell. They include a letter in the form of a diary, written by Cusack on holidays in Lisdoonvarna in July 1902, photographs, a prayer book he gave his wife Margaret (née Woods), and a book of minutes of the Dublin Hurling Club of 1884.

References

External links
 Michael Cusack Visitor Centre
 Michael Cusack's Sydney GAA
 Chicago Michael Cusack Hurling Club
 Michael Cusacks London GAA
 
 NUIG Archives list P95 

1847 births
1906 deaths
Founders of Gaelic games institutions
Irish schoolteachers
Gaelic games players from County Clare